Babcock Street station is a light rail stop on the Massachusetts Bay Transportation Authority (MBTA) Green Line B branch, located in the median of Commonwealth Avenue in the west part of the Boston University campus. The accessible station has two side platforms serving the line's two tracks, with access at Babcock Street and Pleasant Street. 

Streetcar service on Commonwealth Avenue began in 1896 under the West End Street Railway. The line passed through several operators; in the 1960s, it became the Green Line B branch. Stops were located at Alcorn Street – moved east to Babcock Street around 1975 – and Pleasant Street. Planning for consolidation of the two stations into a single accessible station as part of a stop consolidation project began in 2014. Construction of Babcock Street station and nearby Amory Street station began in February 2021; they opened on November 15, 2021.

Station layout
Babcock Street station is located in the median of Commonwealth Avenue between Harry Agganis Way and Babcock Street, adjacent to the West Campus section of Boston University. The station has two accessible -long side platforms serving the two tracks of the B branch. The platforms are located in the middle of the -long block, with walkways from the platforms to both streets. Each platform has a -long canopy for passengers, with wavy colored panels on both sides.

History

Streetcar service

The West End Street Railway built a new streetcar line in the median of Commonwealth Avenue in the mid-1890s. This route was extended to Nonantum Square on existing tracks later that year; it began using the Tremont Street subway on November 8, 1897. The Boston Elevated Railway (BERy) leased the West End Street Railway on October 1, 1897, and continued its system expansion. New tracks on Commonwealth Avenue from Chestnut Hill Avenue to Brighton Avenue were opened by the BERy on May 26, 1900, allowing direct service from Lake Street to downtown via Commonwealth Avenue. The Nonantum Square line was extended to Watertown Yard in 1912, forming the service pattern for the next half-century.

The new Braves Field opened on August 18, 1915; it included a loop track between Gaffney Street and Babcock Street with a prepayment station to allow streetcars to directly serve the ballpark. The loop was also used to turn trains for Red Sox games at Fenway Park, and for rush-hour short turns; after November 1945, these short turns also operated during midday and on Saturdays. It was heavily used during games; for the 1948 World Series, streetcars ran between Park Street and Braves Field on 45-second headways. Boston University purchased Braves Field in 1953 when the Braves moved to Milwaukee, and soon wished to use the loop area for other purposes. After several years of requests, the loop was abandoned on January 15, 1962. The site was proposed for a transfer station (to allow rapid transit service through the subway to ) in 1921. The proposed station was moved west to  the next year, and ultimately was never built.

The BERy was succeeded by the Metropolitan Transit Authority (MTA) in 1947; the MTA in turn was succeeded by the Massachusetts Bay Transportation Authority (MBTA) in 1964. The MBTA designated the remaining streetcar lines as the Green Line in 1965; in 1967, the Watertown line became the Green Line A branch, with the Lake Street (Boston College) line becoming the B branch. A branch service ended on June 21, 1969, leaving only the B branch on Commonwealth Avenue. By 1972, stops with small platforms were located at Alcorn Street and Pleasant Street. Around 1975, the Alcorn Street stop was relocated east to Babcock Street.

Stop consolidation

The four stops, which were not accessible, were to be turned into two fully accessible stops as part of a reconfiguration of Commonwealth Avenue between the Boston University Bridge and Packard's Corner. Pleasant Street and Babcock Street stations would be consolidated into one station in the block between the two streets. Work was delayed by the need to complete other roadwork on Commonwealth Avenue. 

The MBTA awarded a $17.8 million construction contract on March 23, 2020. Construction was set to last from February 2021 to early 2022, with night and weekend bustitution (replacement with bus service) for much of 2021. In February 2021, the MBTA announced that the new stop replacing Babcock Street and Pleasant Street would be named Babcock Street. Pleasant Street station permanently closed on February 26, 2021, so that construction of the replacement station could begin. Buses replaced rail service between Washington Street and Kenmore from April 17 to May 9 and May 17 to June 13, 2021, allowing for construction of the new platforms and canopy steelwork. On July 30, 2021, two westbound trains collided next to the under-construction station, causing 25 injuries.

The old Babcock Street station was closed at the end of service on Friday, November 12, 2021. After a weekend closure, the new Babcock Street station opened on November 15; the former station was soon removed.

References

External links

MBTA – Babcock Street
MBTA Stop Consolidation Project

Green Line (MBTA) stations
Railway stations in Boston
Railway stations in the United States opened in 2021